Michael Crane (born 10 July 1982) is a Bermudian cricketer. He has played one first-class match for Bermuda to date, against the USA in the 2004 Intercontinental Cup. He also represented his country in the 2004 ICC Americas Championship.

References

External links
Cricket Archive profile

Living people
Bermudian cricketers
1982 births